Jana Coryn (born 26 June 1992) is a Belgian football striker currently playing for Zulte Waregem in the Super League. She previously represented R.S.C. Anderlecht, SV Zulte Waregem, Club Brugge and Lierse SK in the Belgian First Division.

She is a member of the Belgian national team. As an under-19 international she played the 2011 U-19 European Championship.

At WD Lierse SK she won the top-scorer award in the new Super League Vrouwenvoetbal with 19 goals.

References

External links
 
 
 

1992 births
Living people
People from Waregem
Footballers from West Flanders
Belgian women's footballers
Belgium women's international footballers
Expatriate women's footballers in France
Women's association football forwards
RSC Anderlecht (women) players
BeNe League players
Super League Vrouwenvoetbal players
Belgian expatriate sportspeople in France
Club Brugge KV (women) players
Lierse SK (women) players
Division 1 Féminine players
Lille OSC (women) players
UEFA Women's Euro 2017 players